Learner Tien (born December 2, 2005) is an American tennis player. Tien has a career-high ATP singles ranking of No. 770 achieved on January 16, 2023. He also has a career-high ATP doubles ranking of No. 1,110 achieved on January 9, 2023.

Career

2022: Grand Slam debut
At just 16 years old, Tien won the 2022 USTA Boys 18s National Championship, which earned him a wildcard into the main draw of the 2022 US Open. This made him the youngest player to compete in the men’s singles main draw at the US Open since a then 16-year-old Donald Young (also the champion at Kalamazoo) played in the 2005 US Open and the first 16-year-old to compete since Zachary Svajda in 2019. He lost in four sets to No. 32 seed Miomir Kecmanović.

ATP Challenger and ITF Futures finals

Singles: 1 (0–1)

Doubles: 1 (1–0)

Junior Grand Slam finals

Singles: 1 (1 runner-up)

Doubles: 1 (1 title)

Explanatory notes

References

External links

2005 births
Living people
American male tennis players
Sportspeople from Irvine, California
Tennis people from California
USC Trojans men's tennis players
Grand Slam (tennis) champions in boys' doubles
Australian Open (tennis) junior champions